An annular solar eclipse occurred on March 6, 1905. A solar eclipse occurs when the Moon passes between Earth and the Sun, thereby totally or partly obscuring the image of the Sun for a viewer on Earth. An annular solar eclipse occurs when the Moon's apparent diameter is smaller than the Sun's, blocking most of the Sun's light and causing the Sun to look like an annulus (ring). An annular eclipse appears as a partial eclipse over a region of the Earth thousands of kilometres wide. Annularity was visible from Heard Island and McDonald Islands (now an Australian external territory), Australia, New Caledonia, and New Hebrides (now Vanuatu).

Related eclipses

Solar eclipses 1902–1907

Saros 138 
It is a part of Saros cycle 138, repeating every 18 years, 11 days, containing 70 events. The series started with partial solar eclipse on June 6, 1472. It contains annular eclipses from August 31, 1598 through February 18, 2482 with a hybrid eclipse on March 1, 2500. It has total eclipses from March 12, 2518 through April 3, 2554. The series ends at member 70 as a partial eclipse on July 11, 2716. The longest duration of totality will be only 56 seconds on April 3, 2554.
<noinclude>

Tritos series

Notes

References

1905 3 6
1905 in science
1905 3 6
March 1905 events